Ardella V. Delker (October 21, 1924 – January 31, 2018) was an American contralto sacred music female vocalist who sang on the Voice of Prophecy radio ministry beginning in 1947.

Biography

Delker was born in Java, South Dakota, in 1924.  She started singing informally at a young age, such as an incident when she was three years old, when she became separated from her parents and started singing in front of the local bank; people passing by offered her money for her performance.  When she was seven, her mother, by now separated from her father, moved to California with Del and her brother.  Her mother was a Seventh-day Adventist, and sent Del to an Adventist school for grades 5 through 8, but Del was not interested in the church, preferring to sing popular music, and volunteering to sing to the armed forces.

After attending a series of meetings held by The Quiet Hour in March 1947, she joined the Seventh-day Adventist Church, and immediately began singing for The Quiet Hour.  That summer she was invited to join the Voice of Prophecy, as a secretary and a singer for their radio broadcasts.  She said no three times, because she had no formal musical training and could not read music; and also because she intended to attend college that fall.  However, the fourth time she was asked, she accepted.

In 1951, she was recorded for the first time, on a record that featured the King's Heralds male quartet.  At the Voice of Prophecy she also had the opportunity to work with famous Seventh-day Adventist composer Wayne Hooper, who wrote many arrangements for her.  In 1953, she finally made it to college, at first attending Emmanuel Missionary College, and later transferring to La Sierra College in order to continue singing with the Voice of Prophecy.  She graduated in 1958 with a degree in religion with an emphasis in counselling.

Delker recorded over forty albums for Chapel Records since the early 1950s.  Among the songs she is best known for are "The Love of God", "Ten Thousand Angels", and "The Night Watch".  In addition to her scores of recordings in English, she has also recorded several gospel albums in Spanish and Portuguese, recording songs in 15 languages in total, as well as religious music for children.

Delker toured the world with Voice of Prophecy revivals and performed in many nations, often singing Christian hymns in the native languages.  She sang frequently with the King's Heralds, and at meetings led by H.M.S. Richards.  She also sang frequently for the Voice of Prophecy radio broadcasts.  Due to her involvement with Adventist radio and television ministries, Del Delker became one of the most well-known musicians with the Seventh-day Adventist church.  After the Voice of Prophecy music department was disbanded in 1982, she continued to sing for their broadcasts, and also sang for the Faith for Today television broadcast.  She officially retired in 1990, but continued to sing and record albums in her retirement.

She was a good friend of composer Hugh Martin who she collaborated with in the 1980s and the 1990s, and who served as her accompanist, and he later penned a new version of his Christmas song "Have Yourself a Merry Little Christmas" entitled "Have Yourself A Blessed Little Christmas", which Delker recorded in 1999.  In 2002, she released her autobiography, Del Delker: Her Story,  co-written by Ken Wade and published by Pacific Press.

Delker's last performance was in 2007, at the age of 82, for the funeral of her long-time collaborator Wayne Hooper.  She died on January 31, 2018, in Porterville, California.  Upon her death, Ted Wilson, President of the Seventh-day Adventist Church, released the following statement: "When we get to heaven, we will meet many people who were not only blessed by Del's voice but were influenced by her Christ-centered singing to make a decision to follow Jesus."

Selected discography

Del Delker released music almost exclusively through Chapel Records, the official music label of the Seventh-day Adventist Church.

References

External links
 Voice of Prophecy website
 "I Know He Watches Me" by Stephen Chavez. Adventist Review cover story on Del Delker's life.
 "The Love of God," as sung by Del Delker for her album "Heaven On My Mind"
 Del Delker in live performance singing "The Wonder Of It All," with the Portuguese King's Heralds in 2001

1924 births
2018 deaths
American women singers
American Seventh-day Adventists
American gospel singers
Chapel Records artists
People from Walworth County, South Dakota